In all there are at least five locations in different countries that are claimed to be the Tomb of Noah.

See also

 List of burial places of Abrahamic figures
 Karaca Dağ near Diyarbakır
 Noah in Islam

References